Wives at Auction is a 1926 American silent drama film directed by Elmer Clifton and starring Edna Murphy, Gaston Glass and Arthur Donaldson. It was shot at the  Tec-Art Studio.

Synopsis
Violet Kingston is rescued from an attack by socialite Mark Cameron. Her mother pushes her towards marriage with their wealthy landlord Sylvester Hatch, but she marries Cameron. When Hatch is then found dead suspicion points at Cameron.

Cast
 Edna Murphy as Violet Kingston 
 Gaston Glass as Mark Cameron 
 Marie Schaefer as Mrs. Kingston - Violet's Stepmother
 Arthur Donaldson as Sylvester Hatch

References

Bibliography
 Munden, Kenneth White. The American Film Institute Catalog of Motion Pictures Produced in the United States, Part 1. University of California Press, 1997.

External links

1926 films
1926 drama films
Silent American drama films
Films directed by Elmer Clifton
American silent feature films
American black-and-white films
1920s American films